Dictyonellidae is a family of sponges in the order Bubarida.

Genera
Acanthella Schmidt, 1862
Dictyonella Schmidt, 1868
Liosina Thiele, 1899
Lipastrotethya de Laubenfels, 1954
Phakettia de Laubenfels, 1936
Rhaphoxya Hallmann, 1917
Scopalina Schmidt, 1862
Stylissa Hallmann, 1914
Svenzea Alvarez, van Soest & Rützler, 2002
Tethyspira Topsent, 1890

References

Heteroscleromorpha
Sponge families
Animals described in 1990
Taxa named by Rob van Soest